Parmu ka Purwa is a village in Bhognipur tehsil, Kanpur Dehat district, Uttar Pradesh, India. It is situated on a Grand Trunk Road. The nearest railway station is Chaurah.

External links
Google Maps

Villages in Kanpur Dehat district